The 2009–10 Bulgarian Hockey League season was the 58th season of the Bulgarian Hockey League, the top level of ice hockey in Bulgaria. Four teams participated in the league, and HK Slavia Sofia won the championship.

Standings

External links
 Season on hockeyarchives.info

Bulgar
Bulgarian Hockey League seasons
Bulg